In photography, the sunny 16 rule (also known as the sunny  rule) is a method of estimating correct daylight exposures without a light meter. Apart from the advantage of independence from a light meter, the sunny 16 rule can also aid in achieving correct exposure of difficult subjects.  As the rule is based on incident light, rather than reflected light as with most camera light meters, very bright or very dark subjects are compensated for.  The rule serves as a mnemonic for the camera settings obtained on a sunny day using the exposure value (EV) system.

Using the rule

For example:

More in general, the adjustment is done such that for each stop in aperture increase (i.e., decreasing the f-number), the exposure time has to be halved, and vice versa. This follows the more general rule derived from the mathematical relationship between aperture and exposure time—within reasonable ranges, exposure is inversely proportional to the square of the aperture ratio and proportional to exposure time; thus, to maintain a constant level of exposure, a change in aperture by a factor c requires a change in exposure time by a factor  and vice versa. A change in the aperture of 1 stop always corresponds to a factor close to the square root of 2, thus the above rule.

Alternative rule
An elaborated form of the sunny 16 rule is to set shutter speed nearest to the reciprocal of the ISO film speed / setting and f-number according to this table:

{| class="wikitable"
! Aperture
! Lighting conditions
! Shadow detail
|-
| 22
| Snow/sand
| Dark with sharp edges
|-
| 16
| Sunny
| Distinct
|-
| 11
| Slight overcast
| Soft around edges
|-
| 8
| Overcast
| Barely visible
|-
| 5.6
| Heavy overcast
| No shadows
|-
| 4
| Open shade/sunset
| No shadows
|-
| Add one stop
| Backlighting
| n/a
|}

See also 
Looney 11 rule

References

External links 
 Guide to Photography Sunny 16 and film exposure guide.

Photographic techniques
Rules of thumb